Matthew Arthur T. Southgate (born 3 October 1988) is an English professional golfer who plays on the European Tour.

Amateur career
Southgate's biggest success as an amateur was winning the 2010 St Andrews Links Trophy. His last round of 67 on the Old Course gave him victory by 5 shots.

Professional career
After turning professional, Southgate played on the Challenge Tour in 2011, finishing second to Édouard Dubois in the Scottish Hydro Challenge. From 2012 to 2015 he had little success but finished 6th in the 6-round 2015 European Tour Qualifying School final stage at PGA Catalunya Resort to gain his European Tour card for 2016.

His big breakthrough came in the 2016 Dubai Duty Free Irish Open where he finished fourth behind Rory McIlroy, earning him 200,000 euros. He continued his run of good form by qualifying for the Open Championship by winning the final qualifying at Royal Cinque Ports, finishing tied for 11th in the Open de France and then tying for 12th place in the Open.

Southgate had a disappointing start to 2017 but hit form again in the same events as he had in 2016. He qualified again for the Open Championship through final qualifying at Royal Cinque Ports, was a joint runner-up in the Dubai Duty Free Irish Open, behind Jon Rahm, and tied for 6th place in the Open. In September 2017, in his bid to secure a PGA Tour card through the Web.com Tour Finals, Southgate was handed a four-stroke penalty in the DAP Championship after a leaf deflected the path of his golf ball mid-putt. Because he didn't replay the putt, he was handed a two-stroke penalty and another two strokes for signing an incorrect scorecard.

Personal
Southgate had testicular cancer in 2015. The cancer was diagnosed after he had played in the Aegean Airlines Challenge Tour in early July. He returned to competitive golf in September, in time to compete in the first stage of the European Tour qualifying.

Amateur wins
2010 St Andrews Links Trophy

Source:

Results in major championships
Results not in chronological order in 2020.

CUT = missed the half-way cut
"T" indicates a tie for a place
NT = No tournament due to COVID-19 pandemic

Results in World Golf Championships

"T" = Tied

See also
2011 European Tour Qualifying School graduates
2012 European Tour Qualifying School graduates
2015 European Tour Qualifying School graduates

References

External links

English male golfers
European Tour golfers
Sportspeople from Southend-on-Sea
1988 births
Living people